Fimbristylis castanea, commonly known as marsh fimbry or saltmarsh fimbristylis, is a perennial sedge of the family Cyperaceae that is native to the United States of America.

Description

Its narrow leaves grow from the base of the plant. They are dark brown and sturdy at the base and grow from one half to two thirds of the plant's height in length. The small flowers of the sedge are hidden behind dark, glossy, brown scales that form budlike spikelets.

Distribution and habitat

It is found in the south eastern states from Texas extending east and north around the coast as far as New York.

It commonly grows in salt marshes coastal dunes, and brackish marsh inland, especially near wharves.

References

Flora of Texas
Flora of New York (state)
castanea
Taxa named by Martin Vahl